Ned Doman High School is a school in the Western Cape of South Africa.

References

Schools in Cape Town